Hadi Zarrin-Saed (July 25, 1979) is an Iranian football goalkeeper, who currently plays for Naft Iranian F.C. in Azadegan League.

Club career
He currently plays for Naft va Gaz Gachsaran F.C. in 2nd division formerly played for Baadran Tehran F.C.

Club Career Statistics
Last Update: 25 January 2011

Honours

Club
Esteghlal
Hazfi Cup (1): 2011–12

References

External links
 Hadi Zarrin Saed  at PersianLeague

Iranian footballers
1979 births
Living people
Shirin Faraz Kermanshah players
Homa F.C. players
Tractor S.C. players
Machine Sazi F.C. players
Esteghlal F.C. players
Association football goalkeepers
21st-century Iranian people